Henderson Creek is a stream in western Iron County in the U.S. state of Missouri. It is a tributary of Neals Creek.

The stream headwaters arise just south of Missouri Route 32 about 1.5 miles east of Bixby. The stream flows to the southeast about 2.5 miles to its confluence with Neals Creek. Missouri Route 49 runs parallel to the stream on the ridge to the east.

Henderson Creek has the name of the local Henderson family.

See also
List of rivers of Missouri

References

Rivers of Iron County, Missouri
Rivers of Missouri